Sergio Munoz may refer to:

 Sergio Munoz (politician) (born 1982), Democratic member of the Texas House of Representatives
 Sergio Muñoz (gymnast) (born 1989), Spanish gymnast
 Sergio Garrote Muñoz (born 1979), Spanish Para-cyclist